Dijana Stojić (born 16 July 1988) is a Bosnian-born Croatian former professional tennis player.

Stojić is originally from Tuzla in Bosnia and Herzegovina, but also grew up in the Croatian city of Makarska, having relocated there due to the war. She received her tertiary education at the University of South Carolina, where she competed on the varsity tennis team and retired ranked eighth for career SEC singles wins.

Between 2003 and 2009, Stojić represented the Bosnia and Herzegovina Fed Cup team in a total of 15 ties, winning ten of her 14 singles rubbers and one of her two doubles rubbers. During this time, she also appeared on the ITF Women's Circuit and won two singles titles, at Mostar in 2004 and Podgorica in 2005.

ITF finals

Singles (2–3)

Doubles (1–1)

References

External links
 
 
 

1988 births
Living people
Croatian female tennis players
Bosnia and Herzegovina female tennis players
South Carolina Gamecocks women's tennis players
Bosnia and Herzegovina emigrants to Croatia
Croats of Bosnia and Herzegovina
Sportspeople from Tuzla
Sportspeople from Makarska